Aiden Robert Moffat (born 28 September 1996) is a British racing driver currently competing in the British Touring Car Championship for Laser Tools Racing. He became the youngest driver ever to compete in the BTCC when he made his debut at the Knockhill round of the 2013 season.

Career

British Touring Car Championship

Moffat made his début in the British Touring Car Championship with Finesse Motorsport in the Jack Sears Trophy for S2000 cars at the Knockhill round of the 2013 season at the age of 16 years, 10 months and 28 days, less than 12 months after racing in the Ginetta Junior series finale at Brands Hatch. This beat the record for youngest driver set by Tom Chilton when he made his debut in 2002 at the age of 17 years and 17 days.

He missed the round at Rockingham due to clashing with his other racing commitments, prior to the next round at Silverstone he switched to Tony Gilham Racing where he would drive an NGTC Volkswagen CC for the remaining two rounds of the season.

He failed to score a point in the opening round of the 2017 BTCC Season, but took his first win in the next round at Donington Park. He would add a second victory in the final round at Brands Hatch.

Racing record

Complete British Touring Car Championship results
(key) (Races in bold indicate pole position – 1 point awarded just in first race; races in italics indicate fastest lap – 1 point awarded all races; * signifies that driver lead race for at least one lap – 1 point given all races)

Complete TCR UK Touring Car Championship results
(key) (Races in bold indicate pole position – 1 point awarded just in first race; races in italics indicate fastest lap – 1 point awarded all races; * signifies that driver led race for at least one lap – 1 point given all races)

References

External links
Official website
Profile at btcc.net

1996 births
Living people
British Touring Car Championship drivers
British racing drivers
24H Series drivers
Scottish racing drivers
Ginetta Junior Championship drivers